Raúl Marcelo Bobadilla (born 18 June 1987) is a Paraguayan Argentine footballer who plays as a striker for Swiss club Schaffhausen.

Born and raised in Argentina, the son of Paraguayan parents, he represents Paraguay at international level, making his senior debut in 2015.

Career

Early career
Bobadilla originally started out at River Plate but moved to Concordia Basel in the Swiss Challenge League for the 2006–07 Swiss Challenge League season. Murat Yakin was trainer at that time and for Bobadilla this was a very successful season. He scored 18 goals in 28 League games and finished third in the goal scorer list at the end of the season. Yakin left Concordia and went to Grasshopper Club Zürich as assistant trainer to Hanspeter Latour for the 2007–08 Super League season and took Bobadilla with him. Bobadilla continued his good goalscoring form, becoming their first choice striker. Bobadilla finished in second place of the goal scorer list at the end of the season and was shortlisted in the Final 4 players for the Swiss League player of the year for the 2007–08 season, which was ultimately won by Hakan Yakin.

Bobadilla signed for Borussia Mönchengladbach on 11 June 2009 but returned to Switzerland in 2012 to play for Bern's BSC Young Boys.

Basel
On 3 January 2013, FC Basel announced that Bobadilla signed a contract until 2017. He joined Basel's first team during the winter break of their 2012–13 season under head coach Murat Yakin.

After playing in four test games, in the last of which he was injured, he made his league debut for Basel on 1 April in the 4–0 away win against Luzern being substituted in during the 77th minute of the game. He scored his first goal for his new club in the home game in the St. Jakob-Park on 1 June 2013. It was the only goal of the game as Basel won 1–0 against St. Gallen.

At the end of the Swiss Super League season 2012–13 he won the Championship title with the team. In the 2012–13 Swiss Cup Basel reached the final, but were runners up behind Grasshopper Club, being defeated 4–3 on penalties, following a 1–1 draw after extra time. In the 2012–13 UEFA Europa League, Basel advanced as far as the semi-finals, there being matched against the reigning UEFA Champions League holders Chelsea. Chelsea won both games advancing 5–2 on aggregate, eventually winning the competition.

Soon after the start of the next season, Bobadilla was caught speeding with his Maserati, driving with 111km/h in a 50km/h zone. On 15 August it was announced that  Bobadilla would leave Basel. During his short period with the club, Bobadilla played a total of 25 games for Basel scoring three goals. 13 of these games were in the Swiss Super League, one in the Swiss Cup, one in the Champions League and ten were friendly games. He scored two goals in the domestic league and the other was scored during the test games.

Augsburg
On 15 August 2013, FC Augsburg announced that Bobadilla signed a contract until 30 June 2016.

On 9 May 2015, Bobadilla scored the only goal as Augsburg won away at Bayern Munich, who had already won the league title, a back-heel after a cross from Pierre-Emile Højbjerg, who was on loan from the opponent. In the 14th minute, he had been fouled by goalkeeper Pepe Reina for a penalty, resulting in Reina's dismissal, but Paul Verhaegh's shot hit the post with Manuel Neuer taking over in goal.

Bobadilla finished the 2014–15 season as Augsburg's top-scorer with 10 goals in all competitions.

Borussia Mönchengladbach  
On 17 August 2017, after 4 years in Augsburg, Bobadilla returned to Borussia Mönchengladbach on a two-year contract.

Argentinos Juniors 
Bobadilla returned to Argentina after spending one year with Borussia Mönchengladbach.

Guarani 
On 27 December 2019, Bobadilla was loaned to Club Guaraní in Paraguay's Primera División.

Controversy 
On 29 December 2020, after scoring and giving his team a 3–2 win, Bobadilla was threatened with a ban for partially exposing his genitals during a goal celebration.

International career 
On 9 February 2015, it was reported by D10 and ABC Color that Bobadilla had begun the process of taking up Paraguay's nationality in order to represent the Paraguay national team, by way of his Paraguayan parents. On 11 March, he received his first call-up to the team, for friendlies later that month against Mexico and Costa Rica, making his debut in a 0–0 draw in San José.

On 28 May 2015, Bobadilla was included in Paraguay's 23-man squad for the 2015 Copa América by coach Ramón Díaz. He started in the team's opening 2–2 draw against Argentina in La Serena.

Honours
Basel
 Swiss Super League: 2012–13
 Swiss Cup runner up: 2012–13

References

External links
 
 Raul Bobadilla Profile at FC Basel 
 Statistics at Guardian Stats Centre
 

1987 births
Living people
Argentine footballers
Argentine expatriate footballers
Argentine sportspeople of Paraguayan descent
Citizens of Paraguay through descent
Paraguayan footballers
Paraguayan expatriate footballers
Paraguay international footballers
FC Concordia Basel players
Grasshopper Club Zürich players
Borussia Mönchengladbach players
Aris Thessaloniki F.C. players
BSC Young Boys players
FC Basel players
FC Augsburg players
Argentinos Juniors footballers
Club Guaraní players
Super League Greece players
Swiss Super League players
Swiss Challenge League players
Bundesliga players
Argentine Primera División players
Paraguayan Primera División players
Expatriate footballers in Argentina
Expatriate footballers in Switzerland
Expatriate footballers in Germany
Association football forwards
People from Formosa, Argentina
Argentine expatriate sportspeople in Germany
Argentine expatriate sportspeople in Switzerland
Argentine expatriate sportspeople in Greece
Paraguayan expatriate sportspeople in Germany
Paraguayan expatriate sportspeople in Switzerland
Paraguayan expatriate sportspeople in Greece
2015 Copa América players
Fluminense FC players
Campeonato Brasileiro Série A players
Expatriate footballers in Brazil
Argentine expatriate sportspeople in Brazil
Paraguayan expatriate sportspeople in Brazil